Jacob F. Jacobson (January 13, 1849 – April 19, 1938) was an American businessman and politician.

Jacobson was born in Ryfylke, Rogaland, Norway and emigrated to the United States in 1857. He moved to Dover Township, Fayette County, Iowa and then settled in Madison, Lac qui Parle County, Minnesota in 1871 with his wife and family. He was an agriculture implement dealer. Jacobson served as the Lac qui Parle County Auditor and was the president of the  Lac qui Parle County Agriculture Society. Jacobson served in the Minnesota House of Representatives in 1889 and 1890 and from 1893 to 1902. He was a Republican. Jacobson died at his home in Madison, Minnesota.

References

1849 births
1938 deaths
Norwegian emigrants to the United States
People from Ryfylke
People from Madison, Minnesota
Businesspeople from Minnesota
Republican Party members of the Minnesota House of Representatives